The year 1905 in architecture involved some significant architectural events and new buildings.

Events
 October 18 – London County Council's new street at Kingsway and redevelopment of Aldwych are opened.
 Work begins on Stoclet Palace, Brussels, designed by Josef Hoffmann.
 Work begins on Casa de les Punxes, Barcelona, designed by Josep Puig i Cadafalch.
 Formation of the Dresden Die Brücke expressionist architecture movement.

Buildings and structures

Buildings opened

 February 27 – Berlin Cathedral in Berlin, Germany, is inaugurated.
 June 11 – National Theatre of Venezuela, Caracas, Venezuela
 September 27 – Arcade du Cinquantenaire in Brussels, Belgium, opened by Leopold II of Belgium.
 November – The Plaza Grill and Cinema, Ottawa, Kansas, possibly the oldest movie theater in the United States that is still in operation.

Buildings completed
 January – Eitel Building in Downtown Seattle, Washington, United States, designed by William Doty van Siclen.
 Darwin D. Martin House in Buffalo, New York, United States, designed by Frank Lloyd Wright.
 Zacherlhaus in Vienna, Austria, designed by Jože Plečnik.
 Land Administration Building in Brisbane, Australia, designed by Thomas Pye.
 St. Stephen's Basilica in Budapest, Hungary, completed by József Kauser to an 1851 design by Miklós Ybl.
 Salepçioğlu Mosque in İzmir, Turkey.
 Chancel and lady chapel to St John the Divine, Richmond, London, England, designed by Arthur Grove.
 Hôtel de ville (city hall) in Sfax, Tunisia, designed by Raphaël Guy.
 National Library of Greece, Athens, designed by Theophil Hansen.
 Parliament House in Stockholm, Sweden is completed.
 Voewood, High Kelling, Norfolk, England, designed by E. S. Prior.
 Antwerpen-Centraal railway station in Belgium, designed by Louis Delacenserie.
 Murry Guggenheim House in West Long Branch, New Jersey, designed by Carrère and Hastings.

Awards
 RIBA Royal Gold Medal – Aston Webb.
 Grand Prix de Rome, architecture: Albert Henry Krehbiel.

Births
 February 13 – Werner Schindler, Swiss architect and Olympic medallist (died 1986)
 March 19 – Albert Speer, German architect and Nazi minister during Adolf Hitler's regime (died 1981)
 April 4 – Erika Nõva, Estonian architect (died 1987)
 April 13 – Bernard Rudofsky, Moravian-born American writer, architect, collector, teacher, designer and social historian (died 1988)
 June 24 – Michael Scott, Irish architect (died 1989)
 December 18 – Roy Grounds, Australian architect (died 1981)

Deaths
 March 9 – Ludvig Fenger, City Architect of Copenhagen (born 1833
 March 11 — William R. Walker, American architect based in Providence, Rhode Island (born 1830)
 July 24 – Adolf Cluss, German-born American engineer architect in Washington, D.C. (born 1825)
 August 2 – Cesar Castellani, Maltese architect working in British Guiana
 August 22 – Alfred Waterhouse, English architect of the Gothic Revival (born 1830)

References